23 Hours to Kill is a  2020 stand-up comedy special starring Jerry Seinfeld. The special debuted on Netflix on May 5, 2020. It was taped in October 2019 at the Beacon Theatre in New York City. It is the second stand-up special Seinfeld has done for Netflix in a two-part deal that started with the 2017 special, Jerry Before Seinfeld. The teaser from Netflix released on April 23, 2020 with a secret agent theme. The special is one hour long and covers topics including: "talking vs. texting, bad buffets vs. so-called 'great' restaurants, and the magic of Pop Tarts."

Reception

Brian Logan of The Guardian gave the special four out of five stars, saying "Finding a novel angle on everything from Pop-Tarts to the annoyances of modern technology, the American everyman is still on sparkling form." Richard Roeper of the Chicago Sun-Times gave three and one-half stars out of four, and stated, "It’s classic cranky Seinfeld, but there’s such a spring in his step as he moves about the stage, such a twinkle in his eye as his voice goes higher, to the point where he sounds like everyone’s not-good imitation of Jerry Seinfeld, that none of it comes across as angry."

See also
 Jerry Seinfeld#Discography

References

External links
 
 

Stand-up comedy concert films
Netflix specials
2020s American television specials
Jerry Seinfeld albums